Anna Franciska Mannheimer (born 5 July 1963 in Gothenburg, Sweden) is a Swedish television and radio presenter, journalist and comedian. She is daughter to Sören and Carin Mannheimer, and cousin to Clara Mannheimer. She is married to Peter Apelgren.

Mannheimer is well known as host in TV/radio programmes, among them Rally, Let's Go and Detta har hänt. She also participated in Svenska hjärtan as Franciska Mannheimer.

References

External links

Swedish journalists
Swedish women journalists
Living people
1963 births
Swedish television hosts
Swedish women television presenters
Swedish women comedians
People from Gothenburg
Swedish radio presenters
Swedish women radio presenters
20th-century Swedish comedians
21st-century Swedish comedians